Blanco Ditch is a  long 1st order tributary to Sewell Branch in Kent County, Delaware.

Course
Blanco Ditch rises on the Jordan Branch divide about 0.5 miles east of Pearsons Grove, Delaware.

Watershed
Blanco Ditch drains  of area, receives about 44.7 in/year of precipitation, has a topographic wetness index of 650.47 and is about 3.9% forested.

See also
List of rivers of Delaware

References 

Rivers of Delaware
Rivers of Kent County, Delaware